Minnesota State Highway 20 (MN 20) is a short  highway in southeast Minnesota, which runs from its intersection with State Highway 19 in Cannon Falls (near U.S. 52) and continues north to its northern terminus at its intersection with State Highway 50 near Miesville, 400 feet west of U.S. 61.

Highway 20 passes through the city of Cannon Falls and Douglas Township.

Route description
Highway 20 serves as a north–south route between Cannon Falls and State Highway 50 near Miesville. Its northern terminus is 400 feet west of Highway 50's junction with U.S. 61.

Highway 20 is also known as:

4th Street N and 5th Street N in Cannon Falls
Cannon Falls Boulevard in southeast Dakota County

The route crosses the Cannon River in the city of Cannon Falls.

There are no signs at the Highway 19 exit from U.S. 52 at Cannon Falls that indicate the short connection via Highway 19 to Highway 20, though at the end of the offramps the connection is indicated.

History
Highway 20 was designated and signed in 1920 from the Iowa border near Canton to its current northern terminus. U.S. Route 55 was established in 1927 along this road from the Iowa border to Cannon Falls. When U.S. Route 52 was extended into Minnesota in 1934 to replace U.S. 55, the Highway 20 designation was removed from this portion of the highway, leaving only the section that remains today.

The route was paved by 1940.

Major intersections

|-

References

020
Transportation in Goodhue County, Minnesota
Transportation in Dakota County, Minnesota